Uromedina is a genus of flies in the family Tachinidae.

Species
Uromedina atrata (Townsend, 1927)
Uromedina caudata Townsend, 1926
Uromedina eumorphophaga (Baranov, 1934)
Uromedina rufipes Shima, 1985

References

Diptera of Asia
Exoristinae
Tachinidae genera
Taxa named by Charles Henry Tyler Townsend